Ganesh Nagaraju is an Indian biochemist, geneticist, cancer biologist and a full professor at the Department of Biochemistry of the Indian Institute of Science. He has been studying DNA damage responses in mammalian cells, and mechanisms underlying chromosome instability genetic diseases and cancer. The Department of Biotechnology of the Government of India awarded him the National Bioscience Award for Career Development, for his contributions to biosciences, in 2015. In 2018, Nagaraju received the Shanti Swarup Bhatnagar Prize for Science and Technology in Biological Sciences from CSIR. This award is given in recognition of outstanding contributions to Science and Technology, and is considered one of the highest awards for science in India.

Biography 

Ganesh Nagaraju earned his PhD from the Indian Institute of Science in 2003 and did his post-doctoral research at Harvard Medical School and Beth Israel Deaconess Medical Center. On his return to India in 2007, he joined his alma mater, Indian Institute of Science, where he serves as a full professor. His research focus is on cancer biology and chromosome instability and his team is involved in developing DNA repair protocols. His studies have been documented by way of a number of articles and ResearchGate, an online repository of scientific articles has listed 38 of them. Nagaraju has delivered invited speeches at several international conferences which included the seminar on Distinct roles of RAD51 paralogs in DNA damage responses held at Centre for DNA Fingerprinting and Diagnostics on 4 October 2016 and the Indo-French Conference on Recent Advances in Genome Integrity and Plasticity held at Bengaluru in December 2017. Nagaraju also hosts several post-doctoral and doctoral researchers at his laboratory.

Awards and honors 
The Department of Biotechnology (DBT) of the Government of India awarded Nagaraju the National Bioscience Award for Career Development, one of the highest Indian science awards in 2015. He received Prof. K. V. Giri memorial award for best PhD Thesis in 2003, B. M. Birla Science Prize in Biology in 2012. and Sir C.V. Raman Young Scientist award from Government of Karnataka in 2015. The Council of Scientific and Industrial Research awarded him the Shanti Swarup Bhantnagar Prize in Biological Sciences for the year 2018.

Selected bibliography

See also 

 DNA replication
 Reynolds-averaged Navier–Stokes equations

Notes

References

External links 
 

N-BIOS Prize recipients
Indian scientific authors
Living people
Scientists from Karnataka
Indian immunologists
Indian medical writers
Year of birth missing (living people)
Indian cell biologists
Indian molecular biologists
Indian medical researchers
Indian Institute of Science alumni
Academic staff of the Indian Institute of Science
Harvard Medical School alumni
Indian biochemists
Recipients of the Shanti Swarup Bhatnagar Award in Biological Science